Newman Ridge is a ridge in the U.S. state of Tennessee.

Newman Ridge was named after a pioneer who explored the area in the 1760s.

References

Landforms of Hancock County, Tennessee
Ridges of Tennessee